KXSW 89.9 FM is a Community radio station licensed to Sisseton, South Dakota and serving the Lake Traverse Indian Reservation. The station is owned by the Corporation For Native Broadcasting.

See also
List of community radio stations in the United States

References

External links
KXSW's webpage

Community radio stations in the United States
Native American radio
XSW
Dakota culture
Sisseton Wahpeton Oyate